Puerto Rico Highway 123 (PR-123) is a secondary highway that connects the city Arecibo to the city of Ponce. It runs through the towns of Utuado and Adjuntas, before reaching Ponce. A parallel road is being built, PR-10, that is expected to take on most of the traffic currently using PR-123.

History

The road dates from the late 19th century and it started as a road to link the coffee-farming mountain town of Adjuntas to the southern port city of Ponce for the export of coffee. (Eventually the road was completed to the smaller northern port city of Arecibo as well, connecting the mountain town of Utuado in its way.) PR-123 was built under the colonial government of Spain in Puerto Rico to connect the coffee-growing town of Adjuntas to the port city of Ponce as a farm-to-market road. By the early 20th century, it was already graced with many bungalow-style summerhouses.

The construction of the first Ponce-to-Adjuntas road got underway through the dedicated efforts of local political leader, attorney, and composer Olimpio Otero in the late nineteenth century.  In 1887, the Ponce Municipal Assembly issued a resolution to use vagrants in the construction of this road, to add to the labor already being performed by prisoners. In 1903, the Puerto Rico Legislature named a bridge on the Ponce to Adjuntas section of the road to his memory for his outstanding dedication to the building of that stretch of the road.  The bridge is located in the Magueyes barrio of the municipality of Ponce. During his 1910 surveys, American surveyor William H. Armstrong called the road "a beautiful work of engineering." According to Armstrong, the road was 29 kilometers long and had 87 bridges and culverts.

True to its farm-to-market purpose, PR-123 was designed to descend from the mountain town of Adjuntas and make its way through the Cordillera Central until it reached the city of Ponce, edging Plaza Las Delicias, located just two blocks from the Plaza del Mercado de Ponce fruits-and-vegetables central market place.  The road then continued south, via Avenida Hostos, to the port of Ponce where coffee and other farm products were shipped to the United States and Europe. Under the Plan Ponce en Marcha, Avenida Hostos will be enlarged from two to four lanes.

PR-123 was signed PR-10 until a new and wider parallel road was built (see PR-10) which adopted its number.<ref>Abandonados los caminos y carreteras rurales. Eduardo L. Questell Rodríguez. Es Noticia. 5 July 2019. Accessed 6 July 2019. (Digital edition: Abandonados los caminos y carreteras rurales. Eduardo L. Questell Rodríguez. Es Noticia. 5 to 18 July 2019. p. 13.])</ref>Neysa Rodriguez Deynes, Rafael J. Torres Torres, and Carlos Aneiro Perez. Brevario Sobre la Historia de Ponce y sus Principales Lugares de Interes.  Published by Secretaría de Cultura y Turismo of the Government of the Autonomous Municipality of Ponce. Ponce, Puerto Rico. 1st edition. 1991. p. 143. This route signing for this old, winding road can still be seen in some old street maps of the city of Ponce.

The stretch from Ponce to Adjuntas was built under the Spanish government. The remainder of the route to Arecibo was built after the Americans took over in 1898. This second stretch opened on July 1, 1904. The whole course of the road from its southern end in Ponce to its northern end in Arecibo was signed as Road No. 6 in those days.

Navigating this first PR-10 road was very tedious as the road was engineered to run from mountainside to mountainside, following the contours of the mountains, and along the natural definitions of the course of rivers, to reach its destination. Such design, however, limited considerably the speed of travel. It was also necessary to drive through the congested downtown areas of the various towns and villages in the way to get from one terminus of the road to the other, something that proved to be very time-consuming as vehicular traffic in those towns and villages increased. Despite these drawbacks, the road was heavily used for many decades. However, as traffic on this road increased in the 1950s and 1960s, the road started to show its limits.

The completed road had a length of 82 km.

Construction details
The road was built in 13 segments as follows:

Characteristics
The road is prone to landslides and closings due to frequent heavy rains.

Major intersections

See also

 List of highways in Ponce, Puerto Rico
 List of highways numbered 123
 List of streets in Ponce, Puerto Rico

References

Further reading
 Fay Fowlie de Flores. Ponce, Perla del Sur: Una Bibliográfica Anotada. Second Edition. 1997. Ponce, Puerto Rico: Universidad de Puerto Rico en Ponce. p. 110. Item 564. 
 Eugenio Astol. "El diputado 'Carretera'". Puerto Rico Ilustrado.'' 16 de mayo de 1936. pp. 13, 66. (Colegio Universitario Tecnológico de Ponce, CUTPO)

External links

 Arecibo-Ponce Road c. 1930
 The Ponce-Adjuntas Road c. 1940s–1950s
 Juana Matos Bridge in Barrio Magueyes, Ponce, Puerto Rico c. 1908 
 Another view of the Juana Matos Bridge on the Ponce-Adjuntas Road in Barrio Magueyes, Ponce, Puerto Rico c. 1908 
 Abandoned Bus Stop at the intersection of PR-123 and PR-524 in Barrio Pellejas, Adjuntas

123